Cape Hay is an uninhabited headland on Bylot Island in the Qikiqtaaluk Region of Nunavut, Canada. It is located at the island's northwestern tip, protruding into Lancaster Sound. The Wollaston Islands are offshore.

It is named in honor of Admiral Sir John Hay, Secretary of the Royal Navy.

Geography
The habitat is characterized by coastal cliffs, rocky shores, and tundra.

Conservation
The cape is a Canadian Important Bird Area (#NU004) and an International Biological Program site. It is situated within the Bylot Island Migratory Bird Sanctuary and the Sirmilik (North Baffin) National Park. Other IBAs on the island include Cape Graham Moore and the Southwest Bylot plain.

Avifauna

Notable bird species include the black-legged kittiwake and thick-billed murre, both of which are colonial seabirds. The area is also frequented by narwhals, polar bears, harp seals, ringed seals and white whales

References

Peninsulas of Qikiqtaaluk Region
Important Bird Areas of Qikiqtaaluk Region
Important Bird Areas of Arctic islands
Seabird colonies